Niall Bruton (born 27 October 1971) is a former Irish runner who specialized in the 1500 metres, retiring around 2000. From Dublin Niall went to Larkhill National School and then St. Aidan's C.B.S. in Whitehall, he ran with Clonliffe Harriers.

Bruton ran collegiately in the US for the University of Arkansas where he won the mile at the NCAA Indoor Championships in 1993 and 1994.  He was named most outstanding performer among college men at the 1992 Penn Relays.

His personal best 1500 time was 3:35.67 minutes, achieved in August 1995 in Cologne.  Bruton's best time in the mile was 3:53 run in Oslo in 1994.

His career was cut short, however, as he developed arthritis in his right hip, causing him to retire.

Achievements

References

External links

1971 births
Living people
Irish male middle-distance runners
Athletes (track and field) at the 1996 Summer Olympics
Olympic athletes of Ireland
Arkansas Razorbacks men's track and field athletes
People educated at St Aidan's C.B.S.
University of Arkansas people
World Athletics Championships athletes for Ireland
Universiade medalists in athletics (track and field)
Universiade gold medalists for Ireland
Medalists at the 1991 Summer Universiade